ASM Enamul Haque is a Bangladesh Nationalist Party politician and a Member of Parliament from Noakhali-5.

Career
Haque was elected to parliament from Noakhali-5 as an Bangladesh Nationalist Party candidate in February 1996.

References

Bangladesh Nationalist Party politicians
Date of birth missing (living people)
6th Jatiya Sangsad members
People from Companiganj Upazila, Noakhali